Breckland Forest is an 18,126 hectare biological and geological Site of Special Scientific Interest in many separate areas between Swaffham in Norfolk and Bury St Edmunds in Suffolk. It is part of the Breckland Special Protection Area under the European Union Directive on the Conservation of Wild Birds. It contains two Geological Conservation Review sites, Beeches Pit, Icklingham and High Lodge.  Barton Mills Valley is a Local Nature Reserve in the south-west corner of the site.

Woodlarks and nightjars breed on this site in internationally important numbers. There are also several nationally rare vascular plants and invertebrates on the IUCN Red List of Threatened Species. Geological sites provide evidence of the environmental and human history of East Anglia during the Middle Pleistocene.

References

Sites of Special Scientific Interest in Suffolk
Sites of Special Scientific Interest in Norfolk
Special Protection Areas in England
Geological Conservation Review sites